The 2019–20 Scandinavian Cup was a season of the Scandinavian Cup, a Continental Cup season in cross-country skiing for men and women. The season began on 13 December 2019 in Vuokatti, Finland and concluded on 5 January 2020 in Nes, Norway. The season was scheduled to conclude with a stage event 13–15 March 2020 in Otepää, Estonia. The stage event was rescheduled to Harstad, Norway, due to lack of snow in Otepää. Due to the COVID-19 pandemic in Norway, the stage event was cancelled, thus the season ended on 5 January 2020.

Calendar

Men

Women

Men's standings

Overall

Distance

Sprint

Women's standings

Overall

Distance

Sprint

References

External links
Men's Standings (FIS)
Women's Standings (FIS)

Scandinavian Cup
Scandinavian Cup seasons
2019 in cross-country skiing
2020 in cross-country skiing
Scandinavian Cup, 2019-20